Chanon Santinatornkul (born 6 June 1996), nicknamed Non and also known by the alias Nonkul, is a Thai actor. He is best known for starring in the 2017 film Bad Genius, as well as various television roles with Nadao Bangkok.

Early life and education 
Chanon was born on 6 June 1996 in Bangkok. He graduated school from Bangkok Christian College, and completed undergraduate education in film production at Mahidol University International College. He is a practicing Christian. His pastime interests include exercise—in a 2015 interview, he said he would spend 6 days a week at the gym if he had time.

Career
Chanon first appeared in the 2014 indie gay romance Love's Coming as a supporting character, although his first acting role was in Patcha is Sexy, a short film directed by Nawapol Thamrongrattanarit for Young Love, a reproductive health campaign sponsored by the Ministry of Public Health. He appeared in the film's 2015 sequel Love Love You and Keetarajanipon, an anthology film honouring King Bhumibol Adulyadej, before joining the roster of Nadao Bangkok, a talent management company and subsidiary of the production company GTH (now GDH 559). He became widely noticed for his role as Net, a minor character in the hit TV series Hormones. He then appeared in several television roles, and has also done modelling work and appeared in several TV commercials. 

Chanon's role as Bank in the 2017 hit thriller film Bad Genius brought him international fame, especially in China. He has since appeared in the Chinese TV series Blowing in the Wind. He did not renew his contract with Nadao Bangkok when it expired in 2018, and is now working independently.

Filmography

Film

Television series

Awards and nominations
 27th Suphannahong National Film Award for Best Actor, from Bad Genius
 26th Bangkok Critics Assembly Award for Best Actor, from Bad Genius
 Royal Award, Phra Surasawadee for Best Actor, from Bad Genius
 Entertainment Critics Club Awards for Best Actor, from Bad Genius
 25th Asian Television Awards nominations for Best Actor, from Bangkok Love Stories: Plead
 5th Asian Academy Creative Awards pending for Best Actor in a leadind role from Wannabe
 27th Asian Television Awards pending for Best Actor in a Leading Role from The Revenge

References

External links 

 

Chanon Santinatornkul
Chanon Santinatornkul
Chanon Santinatornkul
Chanon Santinatornkul
1996 births
Living people